The 2020–21 Macedonian First League was the 29th season of the Macedonian First Football League, the highest football league of North Macedonia. It began on 8 August 2020 and ended on 16 May 2021. Vardar are the defending champions, having won their eleventh title in 2019–20 after was season abandoned due to the COVID-19 pandemic. They was the third defending champions to be relegated as defending champions.

Promotion and relegation

Participating teams

Personnel and kits

Note: Flags indicate national team as has been defined under FIFA eligibility rules. Players may hold more than one non-FIFA nationality.

League table

Results
Every team will play three times against each other team for a total of 33 matches. The first 22 matchdays will consist of a regular double round-robin schedule. The league standings at this point will then be used to determine the games for the last 11 matchdays.

Matches 1–22

Matches 23–33

Positions by round
The table lists the positions of teams after each week of matches. In order to preserve chronological evolvements, any postponed matches are not included to the round at which they were originally scheduled, but added to the full round they were played immediately afterwards.

Relegation play-offs

Season statistics

Top scorers

See also
2020–21 Macedonian Football Cup
2020–21 Macedonian Second Football League

References

External links
Football Federation of Macedonia 
MacedonianFootball.com 

North Macedonia
1
2020-21